Accusoft is a privately held software company that is headquartered in Tampa, Florida.  It was founded in 1991 as Pegasus Imaging, by Jack Berlin, the current CEO and President.

Currently, the company provides imaging software development kits (SDKs) and applications for multiple platforms and development environments, including iOS, Android, .NET, Silverlight, ASP.NET, ActiveX, Java, Linux, Solaris, macOS, and IBM AIX.

Distribution of products is worldwide through various partners, resellers, and distributors.

History 
Accusoft was originally founded as Pegasus Imaging in 1991. It was established by Jack Berlin, who is the CEO and President. In 1997, it acquired Imaging, Barcode, OCR, and ICR companies. TMS Sequoia, a competitor that offered document image cleanup technology, was acquired in 2004.

In December 2008, Accusoft was acquired, adding additional imaging products, including ImageGear. Three weeks later, the acquisition of Tasman Software was announced, adding Java and Java ME Barcode technology. During March 2009, Pegasus Imaging was rebranded to Accusoft Pegasus.

On October 3, 2011 Adeptol was acquired, adding viewing technology to existing viewing product offerings. On February 21, 2012, Accusoft Pegasus was rebranded as Accusoft.

In 2022, Accusoft made its fourth and largest acquisition with Snowbound, which will expand Accusoft's product portfolio to include document viewing and conversion software development kit solutions.

Awards 
 2012 ‘KMWorld 100 Companies that Matter in Knowledge Management’ 
 2011 One of the Top Places to Work in Tampa Bay 
 2011 Inc. 5000 List of Fastest-Growing Private Companies 
 2011 Earth Charter US Sustainable Business Award 
 2011 ‘KMWorld Trend-Setting Products of 2011’ 
 2010 One of the Top Places to Work in Tampa Bay 
 2010 Inc. 5000 List of Fastest-Growing Private Companies 
 2010 ‘KMWorld Trend-Setting Products of 2010’ 
 2010 ‘KMWorld 100 Companies that Matter in Knowledge Management’ 
 2010 Code Project Members Choice Award for Imaging

Products

 Accusoft Cloud Services for Document Viewing, OCR, Conversion, Barcode, and Image Compression
 HTML5 Document Viewing/Viewers
 Document Signing
 Annotations
 Redactions
 Slideshows
 Full Page OCR
 Barcode
 Image Compression
 Image Processing
 DICOM
 Forms Processing
 Mobile
 PDF
 Scanning
 SharePoint Integration
 SugarCRM HTML5 Document Viewer module
 WordPress HTML5 Document Viewer plugin
 Joomla HTML5 Document Viewer plugin
 Magenta HTML5 Document Viewer extension
 OnTask

See also
Tasword

External links
 http://www.accusoft.com

References

Software companies based in Florida
Companies based in Tampa, Florida
1991 establishments in Florida
Software companies established in 1991
Software companies of the United States
American companies established in 1991